Ilicz Glejzer (4 January 1934 – 16 May 2015), better known as Elias Gleizer, was a Brazilian comedian and actor.

Born in São Paulo, Gleizer was the son of two Polish Jewish immigrants, a shoemaker and a housewife. He began his artistic career at age 12, playing the violin in a youth orchestra. In 1956 he won the award for best actor in an amateur festival, and in 1959 he made his television debut on TV Tupi.  His first major work was Joseph of Egypt, a 1964 telenovela. In 1984 he started an intense collaboration with the Rede Globo, acting in Free to Fly, and then appearing in dozens of telenovelas and miniseries.

Filmography

References

External links  
 

1934 births
2015 deaths
Male actors from São Paulo
Brazilian male film actors
Brazilian male television actors
Brazilian male comedians
Brazilian people of Polish-Jewish descent
Jewish Brazilian male actors
20th-century Brazilian male actors
21st-century Brazilian male actors